Ceire Cion ("Youth of Zion"), sometimes called the Zionist Party or Ethnic Socialist Party, was a centre-left Jewish political party in Latvia during the inter-war period. It was led by jurist Max Lazerson. The party combined the ideas of Zionism and democratic socialism. One of the party's goals was to create a Jewish state in Palestine.

History
The party won a single seat in the 1920 Constitutional Assembly elections. It retained its seat in the 1922, 1925 and 1928 elections, but missed out on a seat in the 1931 elections by 50 votes. Later in 1931 it merged with the Latvian Organisation of Zionist Socialists to form the Zionist-Socialist Party.

See also
Tze'irei Zion
History of the Jews in Latvia

References

Political parties of minorities in Latvia
Defunct political parties in Latvia
Jews and Judaism in Latvia
Jewish Latvian history
Political parties with year of establishment missing
1931 disestablishments in Latvia
Political parties disestablished in 1931
Zionism in Latvia
Zionist political parties in Europe